The Peugeot 2008 DKR is an off-road competition car specially designed to take part in the rally raids with the main objective of winning the Dakar Rally.

Engine specifications

Dakar victories

See also
 Peugeot 2008

References

External links
 OFFICIAL VIDEO PEUGEOT 2008 DKR DAKAR
 

Rally cars
Rally raid cars
Dakar Rally winning cars
DKR 2008